Joan Ingram (born March 1959),  is a Scottish broadcaster, journalist and media company director.

Education 
Ingram studied at the University of Dundee where she obtained an MA Honours degree in politics & jurisprudence in 1981. She later studied at the University of Aberdeen where she obtained an MBA in 1996.

Career 
She began her broadcasting career in 1982 at Radio Tay. Within a year, Ingram joined Grampian Television (now STV North) as a reporter & presenter for the nightly news programme North Tonight and various documentaries. Whilst at Grampian, Ingram also presented political and current affairs programming including Crossfire and Scottish Question Time. Ingram left the station in 1996 and continued to freelance as a television broadcaster until 1999, presenting STV's coverage of the new Scottish parliament.

In 1993, she set up her own Aberdeen-based change management, communications and media company, The Fifth Business. The company expanded its operations to Houston, London and The Hague. It was acquired by ERM in 2019.

She served on the board of Aberdeen Sports Village for six years from 2009. From 2012 to 2018, Ingram served two terms on the independent NHS Pay Review Body, an eight-person committee that advises UK governments on pay-related issues.

Awards 
Ingram was a runner-up in the Association of Scottish Businesswomen's Outstanding Businesswoman of the Year Award 2000.

She was appointed an OBE in the New Year's Honours List of 2018 for her services in the field of healthcare.

References

Alumni of the University of Aberdeen
Alumni of the University of Dundee
Living people
Officers of the Order of the British Empire
Scottish television presenters
Scottish women television presenters
STV News newsreaders and journalists

Scottish businesspeople
Scottish broadcasters